The Tarra River is a perennial river of the West Gippsland catchment, located in the South Gippsland region of the Australian state of Victoria.

Location and features
The river descends  over its  course.

Etymology
In the Aboriginal Braiakaulung language the name for the river is Blindit'yin, meaning "platypus".

The river was named in honour of Charley Tarra, a Gippsland Company Aboriginal guide.

See also

 Rivers of Victoria

References

External links
 

West Gippsland catchment
Rivers of Gippsland (region)